The Dunbeath air crash involved the loss of a Short S.25 Sunderland Mk. III that crashed in the Scottish Highlands on a headland known as Eagle's Rock near Dunbeath, Caithness, on 25 August 1942. The crash killed 14 of 15 passengers and crew, including Prince George, Duke of Kent, who was on duty as an Air Commodore in the Royal Air Force on a mission to Reykjavík; a message of condolence was proposed in Parliament by the British Prime Minister. A Royal Air Force Board of Inquiry determined that the crash was the result of a navigational error by the crew.

Background
The aircraft, assigned to 228 Squadron, was based at RAF Oban. 228 Squadron was part of 18 Group, involved in long-range maritime operations and particularly anti-submarine warfare, reconnaissance and long-range liaison flights.

Flight details
The aircraft and crew were on a VIP transport mission to RAF Reykjavik, specifically to fly Prince George, Duke of Kent, to Iceland. The aircraft took off from a seaplane base at RAF Invergordon on the Cromarty Firth at 1305 GMT on Sunday 25 August 1942 in fog, which persisted.  The Sunderland, flying on instruments, veered off its planned flight path and crashed into the remote Eagle's Rock at 13:42 GMT. Fourteen of the fifteen crew and passengers, including the Duke of Kent, died in the crash.

Official cause
The official board of inquiry concluded that the plane crashed into the hillside due to an error of navigation; i.e. there was not enough allowance made for wind that caused the aircraft to drift off its planned track up the eastern coast of Scotland. 

The Board noted that investigation at the crash site suggested that all four engines were at full power at the time of impact.

Sole survivor
Sergeant Andrew Jack,  the aircraft's Wireless Operator/Air Gunner, survived. Jack recovered from the injuries he sustained in the accident, was later commissioned as a Pilot Officer in the General Duties Branch on 12 January 1945, and served in the RAF up until 1964; retiring as a Flight Lieutenant. Jack died in Brighton in 1978 aged 56.

Flight Sergeant Jack's niece has claimed that Jack told his brother that the Duke had been at the controls of the plane (the Duke had held a pilot's licence since 1929); that Jack had dragged him from the pilot's seat after the crash; and that there was an additional person on board the plane whose identity has never been revealed.

Interment site
Four of the 228 Squadron crew's remains were interred at Pennyfuir Cemetery in Oban. The Duke of Kent, the first member of a British Royal Family to die on active military service since the death of James IV of Scotland at the Battle of Flodden in 1513, was buried in the Royal Burial Ground, Frogmore.

References

Aviation accidents and incidents in 1942
1942 in aviation
Accidents and incidents involving Royal Air Force aircraft
Aviation accidents and incidents in Scotland
1942 in Scotland
1942 disasters in the United Kingdom